Suits (1994) is the fourth solo album by former Marillion singer Fish, and his third studio album with original material (discounting 1993's cover project Songs from the Mirror). It is the first album to be released on Fish's new own label, the Dick Bros Record Company, which he set up after being dropped by Polydor. The album continues the cooperation with producer James Cassidy who had already produced Songs from the Mirror. Cassidy also contributed keyboards recordings and co-wrote five out of ten songs on the original version of this album. Together with keyboardist Foster Paterson, who had been part of the tour line-up since 1992 and co-wrote three tracks, Cassidy takes the role previously held by Mickey Simmonds. Further songwriting credits go to guitarist Robin Boult and bassist David Paton.

The album took Fish the longest time yet to make, several songs on it had already premiered live in summer of 1992.

Singles and chart positions
Despite the lack of major label support, it went to no. 18 on the UK Albums Chart, doing better than both the 1991 album Internal Exile (no. 21) and Songs from the Mirror, which did not chart. However, this would turn out to be Fish's last UK top 40 album. Two singles released from this album ("Lady Let It Lie" and "Fortunes of War") failed to enter the UK top 40. In an attempt to keep up sales for "Fortunes of War" over a longer period, Fish had decided to release four versions of the CD single across four weeks. As an incentive, every individual single CD contained a different version of the title track and three different acoustic recordings each, adding up to a full acoustic album in terms of playing time. However, record shops frustrated this scheme by often selling the complete four-disc set at one time.  A CD of all the acoustic tracks also called Fortunes of War was later released.

Re-releases
After Fish signed with Roadrunner Records in 1998, Suits was re-released on this label along with the other studio albums from the back catalogue. The re-release contained two bonus tracks previously released as B-side of "Lady Let It Lie" and the double vinyl edition.

Track listing
"Mr 1470" (Dick, Foster Paterson, Robin Boult) – 06:04
"Lady Let It Lie" (Dick, David Paton, James Cassidy) – 06:53
"Emperor's Song" (Dick, Cassidy, Boult) – 06:18
"Fortunes Of War" (Dick, Cassidy, Boult) – 07:50
"Somebody Special" (Dick, Boult, Paton) – 05:22
"No Dummy" (Dick, Cassidy, Boult) – 06:16
"Pipeline" (Dick, Paton, Boult) – 06:43
"Jumpsuit City" (Dick, Cassidy, Boult) – 06:49
"Bandwagon" (Dick, Paton, Boult, Paterson, Kevin Wilkinson) – 05:07
"Raw Meat" (Dick, Paterson) – 07:17

Remastered edition
<LI>"Black Canal" (Dick, Paterson) – 08:26
<LI>"Out Of My Life" (Dick, Boult) – 03:45

Personnel
Per album liner notes:
 Derek W Dick (Fish) – lead vocals
 David Paton – bass guitar, backing vocals
 Foster Paterson – keyboards, backing vocals
 Frank Usher – guitars
 Robin Boult – guitars
 Kevin Wilkinson – drums, percussion
 James Cassidy – additional keyboards
 Lorna Bannon – additional backing vocals
 Danny Campbell – additional backing vocals
 Know Academy Senior Choir, conducted by Ken Johnson – choir (2)
 Marc Duff – whistles and flutes (4, 9)
 Charlie McKerron – fiddle (5, 9)
 Bill Gilles – saxophone (4, 6)
 Fraser Speirs – harmonica (8)
 David Murray – bagpipe

Production
 James Cassidy – Arranger, Producer, Engineer, Mixing
 Stuart James – photography
 Steve Pearce – assistant engineer
 Julie Wilkinson – design, illustrations, cover illustration
 Mark Wilkinson – design, illustrations, cover illustration
 Ken Johnson "Snakehips" & His West Indian Dance Band – conductor, choir director

Charts

References

1994 albums
Fish (singer) albums